Alticorpus macrocleithrum is a species of fish in the family Cichlidae. This species differs from all other species of Alticorpus by the presence of a prominent ventral protuberance of the cleithrum on the chest, hence the name macrocleithrum.

Like all members of Alticorpus, A. macrocleithrum has enlarged lateral pores on the lower part of the head. The feeding technique of these species is to 'listen' for any movements within the sediment. Once they have located a prey buried in the sediment, they will dart at it, picking it out of the sediment. The enlarged cleithrum found throughout these species acts as a base for the enlarged musculature needed to pull themselves free of the sediment once buried into it from chasing prey. Their diet can consist of many small organisms including crustaceans, larvae etc.

References

Stauffer & McKaye, 1985.
Ad Konings, 2001. Malawi Cichlids in their natural habitat, 3rd Edition.

Fish of Malawi
macrocleithrum
Taxa named by Jay Richard Stauffer Jr.
Taxa named by Kenneth Robert McKaye
Fish described in 1985
Taxonomy articles created by Polbot
Fish of Lake Malawi